Pat Hartigan (December 21, 1881 – May 8, 1951) was an American actor and director. He appeared in 72 films between 1909 and 1940.  He also directed 14 films between 1911 and 1919.

Selected filmography

 The Life of Moses (1909) - Moses
 The Planter (1917) - Andy Meagher
 The Prussian Cur (1918) - Adm. von Tirpitz
 Why America Will Win (1918)
 Swat the Spy (1918) - Karl Schmidt
 A Fallen Idol (1919) - Brainard's Chief Mate
 The Adventurer (1920) - Captain of the Guards
 The Wonder Man (1920) - Monroe
 Out of the Snows (1920) - John Blakeman
 Conceit (1921) - Sam Boles
 My Old Kentucky Home (1922) - Detective Monahan
 Channing of the Northwest (1922) - Sport McCool
 Down to the Sea in Ships (1922) - Jake Finner
 Fury (1923) - Morgan
 Dark Secrets (1923) - Biskra
 Where the North Begins (1923) - Shad Galloway
 The Darling of New York (1923) - Big Mike
 The Dramatic Life of Abraham Lincoln (1924) - Jack Armstrong
 Big Timber (1924)
 The King of the Wild Horses (1924) - Wade Galvin
 Western Luck (1924) - James Evart
 Welcome Stranger (1924) - Detective
 Find Your Man (1924) - Martin Dains
 Code of the West (1925) - Cal Bloom
 The Thundering Herd (1925) - Catlett
 Paint and Powder (1925) - Steve McCardle
 Below the Line (1925) - Jamber Niles
 Bobbed Hair (1925) - Swede
 The Clash of the Wolves (1925) - Wm. 'Borax' Horton
 The Fighting Edge (1926) - Taggert
 Ranson's Folly (1926) - Sgt. Clancy
 Johnny Get Your Hair Cut (1927) - Jiggs Bradley
 Heaven on Earth (1927) - Anton
 The Enchanted Island (1927) - Red Blake
 Too Many Crooks (1927) - 'Big Dan' Boyd
 A Bowery Cinderella (1927) - Pat Denahy
 A Race for Life (1928) - Tramp
 The Devil's Skipper (1928) - Captain McKenna
 Tenderloin (1928) - 'The Mug'
 State Street Sadie (1928) - Policeman 'Bull' Hawkins
 The Midnight Taxi (1928) - Detective Blake
 Me, Gangster (1928) - Gangster (uncredited)
 In Old Arizona (1928) - Cowpuncher (uncredited)
 From Headquarters (1929) - Spike Connelly
 The Far Call (1929) - Lars Johannson
 The Man Hunter (1930) - Crosby
 Other Men's Women (1931) - Yardmaster (uncredited)
 El código penal (1931) - (uncredited)
 Corsair (1931)
 Handle with Care (1932) - Callahan
 The Power and the Glory (1933) - Board of Directors (uncredited)
 Shadows of Sing Sing (1933)
 Coming Out Party (1934) - Cop (uncredited)
 Judge Priest (1934) - Townsman in Saloon (uncredited)
 The Whole Town's Talking (1935) - Policeman (uncredited)
 Song and Dance Man (1936) - Bailiff (uncredited)
 Human Cargo (1936) - Detective (uncredited)
 High Tension (1936) - Speedboat Pilot (uncredited)
 The Plough and the Stars (1936) - Minor Role (uncredited)
 That Girl from Paris (1936) - Second Immigration Officer (uncredited)
 There Goes My Girl (1937) - Minor Role (uncredited)
 East Side of Heaven (1939) - Doorman (uncredited)
 Union Pacific (1939) - Irishman (uncredited)
 Little Old New York (1940) - Regan's Henchman (uncredited)

External links

1881 births
1951 deaths
Male actors from New York City
American male film actors
American male silent film actors
Male actors from Los Angeles
Film directors from California
20th-century American male actors